The Suffa RT-70 radio telescope (Russian: Суффа РТ-70) is an RT-70 radio telescope at the Suffa Radio Observatory on the Suffa plateau in Uzbekistan. Construction began in the late 1980's, but was put on hold when the Soviet Union fell and the Uzbekistani government abandoned the project. , the Russian government had resumed the construction of the site, with an updated emphasis on millimeter-wave band observations at 100–300 GHz. , construction was reported to be 50% complete. However any construction has stopped and the construction site has been abandoned.

With its 70m antenna diameter, this third unit of the RT-70 telescope was designed to be one of three similar radio telescopes. 

Two completed RT-70 telescopes are:
 Yevpatoria RT-70 radio telescope – at the Center for Deep Space Communications, Yevpatoria,  Crimea
 Galenki RT-70 radio telescope – at the Ussuriysk Astrophysical Observatory, Russia

References

External links 
 Suffa Radio Observatory in Uzbekistan: progress and radio-seeing research plans
 2014 Image

Radio telescopes
Telescopes under construction
Astronomical observatories built in the Soviet Union
Astronomical observatories in Uzbekistan
Space program of Russia